Deh-e Namak is a village in Davudabad Rural District, in the Central District of Arak County, Markazi Province, Iran. At the 2006 census, its population was 1,995, in 533 families.

References 

Populated places in Arak County